The following is a timeline of the history of the city of Kingston upon Hull, East Riding of Yorkshire, England.

Prior to 19th century

 1279 – Market active.
 1293 – Hull Fair begins.
 1295 – Parliamentary representation begins.
 1299 – Town renamed "Kingston-upon-Hull."
 1302 – Quay built.
 1312 – Holy Trinity Church built (approximate date).
 1332 – William de la Pole becomes mayor.
 1369 – Trinity House for seamen established.
 1384 – Charter-House Hospital founded.
 1440 – Town incorporated.
 1486 – Grammar school founded.
 1640 – King Charles visits.
 1642 – Siege of Hull by Parliamentarians.
 1688 – 'Town-taking': townspeople overthrow the Catholic governor.
 1716 – Trinity House marine school founded.
 1773 – Hull Dock Company formed.
 1775 – Hull Subscription Library established.
 1778 – Dock built.
 1780
 William Wilberforce becomes Member of Parliament for Hull.
 Jewish community establishes synagogue.
 1782 – General Infirmary established.
 1792 – St John's Church built.
 1797 - Cooperative mill built.

19th century
 1809 – Humber Dock built.
 1829
 United Gaol and House of Correction in operation.
 Prince's Dock built.
 St Charles Borromeo church opens.
 1836 – Police force established.
 1837 
Drypool and Sculcoates become part of the borough of Hull.
Explosion of the Union Steam Packet in June
 1840
 Hull and Selby Railway begins operating.
 Zoological Gardens established.
 1841 – Thomas Wilson and Company (shipping) in business.
 1850 – Victoria Dock built.
 1851 – Population: 57,484.
 1854
 Royal Institution opens.
 Hull and Holderness Railway begins operating.
 1860 – Pearson Park established.
 1861
 Hull School of Art founded.
 Population: 93,955.
 1864 – Londesborough Barracks completed.
 1865 – Hull Football Club founded.
 1866 – Town Hall, and Exchange built.
 1867 – Hull and East Riding College opens.
 1870 – HM Prison Hull in operation.
 1875 – Tram in operation.
 1880 – Botanic garden opens.
 1881 – Hull Philharmonic Society founded.
 1882
 Marfleet becomes part of the borough of Hull.
 Kingston Amateurs rugby club formed.
 1884 – Hull Amateur Photographic Society founded.
 1885
 Hull and Barnsley Railway begins operating.
 Alexandra Dock built.
 Hull Daily Mail newspaper begins publication.
 1886 – Synagogue established.
 1887 – East Park opens.
 1888 – County borough created per Local Government Act 1888.
 1891 – Population: 199,134.
 1892 – Hull Amalgamated Anglers' Association formed.
 1895 – The Boulevard (stadium) opens.
 1897 – Hull attains city status.

20th century

 1902 – Hull Telephone Department licensed.
 1904 – Hull City Association Football Club formed.
 1906 – Wilberforce and Historical Museum opens.
 1909 – Hull City Hall built.
 1911 – Theatre De Luxe opens.
 1912 – Museum of Fisheries and Shipping and Coliseum theatre open.
 1915 – Pavilion Picture Palace opens.
 1922 – Craven Park inaugurated.
 1927 – University College Hull established.
 1927 – Sutton become part of the borough of Hull.
 1931 – Population: 309,158.
 1937 – Trolleybus begins operating.
 1939 – Hull New Theatre opens.
 1940 – 19 June: Aerial bombing by German forces begins.
 1945 – 17 March: Aerial bombing by German forces ends.
 1946 – Boothferry Park (stadium) opens.
 1966 – Closure of Western General Hospital.
 1971 – Hull Truck Theatre founded.
 1972 – Hull City Council established.
 1974
 City becomes part of Humberside shire county per Local Government Act 1972.
 Airport opens in Kirmington.
 Humberside Police established.
 1981
 Humber Bridge opens.
 Two tornadoes touch down in Hull during the record-breaking nationwide tornado outbreak of 23 November 1981, causing damage to the Port of Hull and the city's north-eastern residential suburbia.
 Population: 266,751.
 1983 – Hull Marina opens.
 1986 – Sister city relationship established with Raleigh, USA.
 1987 – Spurn Lightship museum opens.
 1989 – Streetlife Museum of Transport and new Craven Park (stadium) open.
 1991 – Princes Quay shopping centre in business.
 1993 – Humber Mouth literature fest begins.
 1996 – Hull becomes a unitary authority area.
 1999 – Arctic Corsair museum ship opens.

21st century
 2000 – Closure of Kingston General Hospital.
 2001 – Hull Soul Club (music appreciation group) formed.
 2002 – The Deep (aquarium) and KC Stadium open.
 2007
 Hull Paragon Interchange transport complex and St Stephen's Hull shopping centre open.
 June: Flood.
 Hull Comedy Festival begins.
 2008
 World Trade Centre Hull & Humber opens.
 Freedom Festival (cultural event) begins.
 2010
 Hull History Centre established.
 Larkin 25 fest held.
 2013 – Scale Lane Bridge for pedestrians opens.
 2014 – Legal sanctions against prostitution introduced.
 2017
 Hull is the UK City of Culture
 13 May: Holy Trinity Church rededicated as Hull Minster.
 2018
 January: Banksy work on Scott Street Bridge discovered.
 25 July: Bonus Arena opens

 2019
 October 2019: Hull became the first UK city to have full fibre broadband available for all residents.

See also
 History of Kingston upon Hull
 List of Mayors of Kingston upon Hull
 List of Governors of Kingston-upon-Hull
 Timelines of other cities in Yorkshire and the Humber: Bradford, Sheffield, York

References

Further reading

Published in the 18th century 
 
 1869 reprint
 
 
 
 1885 reprint

Published in the 19th century

1800s–1840s 
 
 
 
 
  + Hull Directory

1850s–1890s

Published in the 20th century

External links

 . Includes digitised directories of Hull, various dates
 Digital Public Library of America. Works related to Hull, various dates

Years in England
 
Hull
Hull
hull